Irmgard of Berg, heiress of Berg (died 1248–1249), was the child of Adolf VI count of Berg (1185–1218) and Berta von Sayn.

She married in 1217 Henry IV, Duke of Limburg (since 1226), who became count of Berg in 1225. Henry IV of Limburg-Berg died on 25 Feb 1246; their descendants were counts of Berg, the county of Berg leaving the descendance of the Ezzonen.

House of Berg
Duchesses of Limburg
1240s deaths
Year of birth unknown